Pamela M. Lee is an art historian and Professor of Modern and Contemporary Art at Yale University. Her research focuses on late modernism and contemporary art, particularly the relationship between aesthetics and politics.

She graduated from Yale College and from Harvard University.

In her work Chronophobia: On Time in the Art of the 1960s, Lee studies art and technology in the 1960s. Within this period, such artists as Bridget Riley, Carolee Schneemann, Jean Tinguely, Andy Warhol, and On Kawara pique her interest. She “identifies an experience of time common to both [art and technology], and she calls this experience 'chronophobia'.”  After studying Michael Fried's essay 'Art and Objecthood', she discovers that as time goes by, art starts to reflect the quickness of time. Within her work, Lee references Alvin Toffler's book Future Shock. She claims that “the concept of time they espouse is chronophobic as defined in her book, and their popularity means that their concept of time was widely shared.” In her work she fears “perpetual presentness, [that is] time is constant without conclusion.” Many chronophobes feel this way, they fear the fact that time is never ending.

Works
 Object to be Destroyed: The Work of Gordon Matta-Clark (MIT Press, 2000) 
 Chronophobia: On Time in the Art of the 1960s (MIT Press, 2004) , 
 Forgetting the Art World (MIT Press, 2012) , 
 New Games: Postmodernism after Contemporary Art (Routledge, 2012) , 
 The Glen Park Library: A Fairy Tale of Disruption (no place press, 2019)

References

Living people
Stanford University faculty
American art historians
Women art historians
Harvard University alumni
Yale College alumni
Year of birth missing (living people)